The Greatest Gift of All is the only Christmas album recorded by American country pop trio Rascal Flatts. It was released October 21, 2016, through Big Machine Records. The album was produced by group member Jay DeMarcus.

Critical reception
Stephen Thomas Erlewine of AllMusic rated the album three stars out of five and wrote that the "blend of the secular and the sacred, the new and the old, is a signature for Rascal Flatts, and it works well here." Laura Hostelley of Sounds Like Nashville wrote that the group "use their years of experience in the studio to attract attention," and complimented the album's production for setting it apart from other holiday-themed releases.

Commercial performance
The Greatest Gift of All debuted at number 167 on the Billboard 200 chart dated November 12, 2016, selling 4,200 copies in its first week. It reached a peak position of 60 on the chart dated December 17, 2016. The Greatest Gift of All also reached number seven and six on the Top Country Albums and Top Holiday Albums charts, respectively. As of November 2017, the album has sold 69,100 copies in the United States.

Track listing

Charts

Weekly charts

Year-end charts

References

External links
 

2016 Christmas albums
Rascal Flatts albums
Big Machine Records albums
Country Christmas albums
Albums produced by Jay DeMarcus